Isaac Marion (born December 30, 1981) is an American writer. He is best known as the best-selling author of the "zombie romance" novel Warm Bodies and its series.

Background
Marion was born December 30, 1981 near Seattle and has mostly lived either in or around the city. He has also lived in Portland.

Career
Before Warm Bodies, Marion had self-published three other novels. Warm Bodies was published by Atria Books on October 14, 2010. It received critical acclaim from publications such as The Guardian, The Seattle Times and Paste and authors Audrey Niffenegger and Stephenie Meyer. Summit Entertainment acquired the rights to the novel, and it has been made into the film Warm Bodies, written and directed by Jonathan Levine and starring Nicholas Hoult, Teresa Palmer and John Malkovich.  The movie was released on February 1, 2013. It went on to create more than a 100 million dollars in international market and was very successful. On January 28, 2013, the prequel novella to Warm Bodies called The New Hunger was published by Zola Books as an eBook.

Marion has stated that the Warm Bodies series will ultimately be four books, with the first true sequel, The Burning World, released on February 7, 2017. To promote the release of THE BURNING WORLD, Marion co-directed a book trailer with Micah Knapp, which premiered on Hypable.

Marion also has one short story published, "Jerry Lives Forever," with the literary nonprofit organization Tethered By Letters.

On November 13, 2018 he self-published the final book in the series, "The Living".

Music
Besides writing books, Marion also writes music. He has a 2007 solo album, Dead Children (released under the name "Isaac Marion's Moon Colony"), which he considers a companion piece to Warm Bodies. He was also part of a brief electronic/indie rock duo named The Tallest Building in the World, with guitarist Jared McSharry. The pair released their lone concept album, Look Down, in 2005. Both albums have been made available to download by Marion via Bandcamp.

Personal life
Marion is also a photographer and a painter. According to his Simon & Schuster biography, Marion decided "to forgo college in favor of direct experience." He began writing while still in high school, and self-published three novels before Warm Bodies.

References

External links
Official website
The Seattle Times on Isaac Marion and Warm Bodies
Seattle Post-Intelligencer interview with Isaac Marion

21st-century American novelists
Living people
Writers from Seattle
American writers about music
American paranormal romance writers
1981 births
American male novelists
21st-century American male writers
Novelists from Washington (state)
21st-century American non-fiction writers
American male non-fiction writers